Krzysztof Ptak (3 April 1954 – 19 August 2016) was a Polish cinematographer. 

Ptak was born in Sulejów in 1954. He graduated from the National Film School in Łódź in 1980 and began his film career by making documentaries. He co-operated with the National Film School of Denmark and was the rector of the UK National Film and Television School.

Ptak pioneered the HDTV in Poland with his 2003 film Pornografia and was one of the first Polish cinematographers to use digital cameras. 

He is the son of Józef Ptak and Alina Ptak and the brother-in-law of another Polish cinematographer, Przemysław Skwirczyński. Ptak and his wife, Malgorzata, had 3 children: Witold, Aneta, and Michal. He died at the age of 62 in Poland on 19 August 2016.

Filmography 
 Neighborhooders (Sasiady) (2014)
 Papusza (2013)
 Magic Piano (2011)
 The Flying Machine (2011)
 Manipulation (2011)
 Skrzaty Fortepianu (short) (2011)
 The Dark House (Dom zly) (2009)
 Afonia i pszczoly 2009
 Nadzieja 2007
 Jasminum 2006
 Mój Nikifor 2004
 Pornografia 2003
 Edi 2002
 Istota 2000
 Weiser 2000
 Przeprowadzki 2000
 Historia kina w Popielawach 1998
 Czas zdrady 1997
 Panna Nikt 1996
 Nocne graffiti 1996
 Dzień wielkiej ryby 1996
 Łagodna 1995
 Artysta. Jerzy Kalina 1994
 Podróż 1994
 O przemyślności kobiety niewiernej. Sześć opowieści z Boccaccia wziętych 1994
 Powidok 1993
 Światło w mroku 1993
 Litwo, słyszę Twój głos 1993
 Jan Józef Lipski 1993
 Dekalog - Polska 93 Dekalog - Polska 93 1993
 Lepiej być piękną i bogatą 1993
 Motyw cienia  1993

References

External links 
 
 Krzysztof Ptak on The New York Times
 Krzysztof Ptak on MSN Movies
 Krzysztof Ptak on Channel 4
 Krzysztof Ptak on 100 Most Significant German Films 
 Krzysztof Ptak on Camerimage
 Krzysztof Ptak on Andrzej Wajda Master School of Film Directing
 Krzysztof Ptak on Polish Wikipedia :pl:Krzysztof Ptak

1954 births
2016 deaths
Polish cinematographers
Polish academics
Film people from Łódź
Łódź Film School alumni